Spur 330 (also known as Decker Drive) is a freeway spur that connects Interstate 10 to SH 146 in Baytown, Texas, United States.

Route description
Spur 330 begins at a partial interchange with I-10 at the eastern bank of the San Jacinto River at the small community of Lynchburg, heading southeast towards Baytown, ending at an interchange with SH 146 on the northwest side of the city.

History
Spur 330 was designated on October 30, 1957 on a route from I-10 east of the San Jacinto River southeastward to at or near the intersection of Decker Drive and Airhart Drive. On November 20, 1973, Spur 330 was extended to Garth Road. The road did not open for traffic until 2010.

Exit list

References

Spur 330
330
Transportation in Harris County, Texas
Freeways in Texas